Goliathus goliatus is a species of beetles of the family Scarabaeidae.

Description 
The pronotum (thoracic shield) is mainly black, with whitish longitudinal stripes, while elytra are usually dark brown. This pattern may differ greatly in some of the many color forms.

This species possess a large and membranous secondary pair of wings actually used for flying. When not in use, they are kept completely folded beneath the elytra. The head is whitish, with a black Y-shaped horn in males, used as a pry bar in battles with other males over feeding sites or mates. These beetles feed primarily on tree sap and fruits.

Distribution 
This species is widespread from western to eastern equatorial Africa (Nigeria, Cameroon, Central African Republic, Gabon, Republic of the Congo, Democratic Republic of the Congo, Uganda, Western Kenya and Northwestern Tanzania).

Habitat 
Goliathus goliatus is mainly present in the equatorial forests and in the sub-equatorial savannah.

Exhibited in 1959 at New York City museum 
On January 1, 1959, a species from Gabon, believed to be the first such beetle seen alive in the United States, went on display at the American Museum of Natural History.

See also 

 List of largest insects

References

External links 

 Natural World
 Goliathus
 Beetle Space

Cetoniinae
Beetles described in 1771
Taxa named by Carl Linnaeus